The Suffolk flag is the registered flag of the county of Suffolk, England. It was registered with the Flag Institute on 9 October 2017. The Flag Institute registered the design after Suffolk County Council displayed the flag on the first "Suffolk Day", and after a number of requests by organisations in the county.



Design
The design is the Saint Edmund's mediaeval banner of arms. It is two gold arrows passing through a gold crown or with heraldic description as Azure two Arrows in saltire, points downwards, enfiled with an ancient Crown Or

Edmund, the Anglo-Saxon king of East Anglia, is strongly connected with Suffolk with his burial site located in the county at Bury Saint Edmunds. It can be seen across the county; incorporated into the county and several town coat of arms as well as association badges or logos and sporting bodies. Following its hoisting by the County Council, to celebrate the yearly Suffolk Day on 21 June 2017, a campaign was initiated to register the armorial banner of Saint Edmund. It was supported by twenty-one county based organisations and in light of this local support as well as the emblem's extensive use across the county, the flag was registered by the Flag Institute.

References

External links
[ Flag Institute registration particulars]
Background on the Suffolk flag

Suffolk
Suffolk
Culture in Suffolk
Suffolk